Eduardo Quintero (born 28 November 1950) is a Cuban former wrestler who competed in the 1972 Summer Olympics.

References

1950 births
Living people
Olympic wrestlers of Cuba
Wrestlers at the 1972 Summer Olympics
Cuban male sport wrestlers
20th-century Cuban people